
The following lists events that happened during 1846 in South Africa.

Events
 Xhosas clash with the white settlers on the Cape Colony's eastern frontier starting the 7th Cape Frontier War, this war was also known as the War of the Axe
 The Voortrekkers establish Bloemfontein
 Approximately 103 settlers start arriving in Port Elizabeth from war-torn Buenos Aires, Argentina

Births
 26 March - Christoffel Cornelis Froneman, an Orange Free State commander and founder of the town Marquard, is born
 28 June  – Willem Eduard Bok, politician, (d. 1904)

References
See Years in South Africa for list of References

Years in South Africa